Penney High School is the public high school in Hamilton, Missouri. The school is named after James Cash "J. C." Penney.

Academics
The year 2016 marked the third in a row when Penney High School was recognized by U.S. News & World Report as a bronze medal school.

Sports

Penney High School is a member of the Kansas City Interscholastic Conference for athletics and music. The girls track and field team won State championships for five years running, from 2007 through 2011, and was runner up in 2014 and 2015. Girls basketball has won a 2A championships in 1977 and in 2008. They finished 3rd in 1978 and 4th in 1979.

The boys won the Class 1A Missouri state high school football championship in 2009, 2012 and 2016. In 2010 won the 2A championship.

References  

Public high schools in Missouri
Caldwell County, Missouri